The 2019 Mobile Mini Sun Cup was the ninth edition of the preseason exhibition soccer tournament among Major League Soccer (MLS) and United Soccer League (USL) teams. It was held from February 2 to February 23 in Oro Valley, Tucson and Phoenix, Arizona.

Teams 
The following clubs entered the tournament:

Major League Soccer
FC Dallas (second appearance)
Houston Dynamo (fourth appearance)
Minnesota United (first appearance)
New York Red Bulls (sixth appearance)
Portland Timbers (second appearance)
Real Salt Lake (sixth appearance)
Seattle Sounders FC (fourth appearance)
Sporting Kansas City (sixth appearance)

USL Championship
Oklahoma City Energy (first appearance)
Phoenix Rising FC (third appearance)

Cup matches 
All times are Mountain Standard Time (UTC-07:00)

Table standings

(C) - Cup Winner
Note: Standings will be determined by points per game (PPG).

Exhibition matches 

Note: Exhibition matches do not count in the cup standings

References 

2019
2019 in American soccer
2019 in sports in Arizona
February 2019 sports events in the United States